Gyula Prassler (also known as Iuliu Iosif Prassler; 1916–1942) was a Romanian football forward who played for Romania in the 1938 FIFA World Cup.

References

External links

1916 births
1942 deaths
Romanian footballers
Romania international footballers
Liga I players
FC Petrolul Ploiești players
Association football forwards
1938 FIFA World Cup players
Romanian sportspeople of Hungarian descent
People from Alba County